Konglungenoceras is a discorid from the lower Silurian of Europe (Norway) included in the Cyrtogomphoceratidae that lacks the septal foramina grasping bullettes at the adapical end of the connecting rings. shells are endogastric and strongly compressed, such that the ventral or siphuncle side is curved inward and the dorso-ventral height is greater than the width. Endosiphuncular deposits in the apical portion of the siphuncle consist of thick overlapping parietal laminae that form endocones, similar to those is Discosorus and Alpenoceras.

Although included in the Cyrtogomphoceratidae, derivation undetermined, siphuncle characters as well as stratigraphic position are suggestive of the Discosoridae.

References

Curt Teichert 1964. Nautiloidea-Discosorida; Treatise on Invertebrate Paleontology Part K, Endoceratoidea, Actinoceratoidea, Nautiloidea. Geological Society of America.

Discosorida
Prehistoric nautiloid genera